Lise Getoor is a professor in the computer science department, at the University of California, Santa Cruz, and an adjunct professor in the Computer Science Department at the University of Maryland, College Park. 
Her primary research interests are in machine learning and reasoning with uncertainty, applied to graphs and structured data. 
She also works in data integration, social network analysis and visual analytics. She has edited a book on Statistical relational learning that is a main reference in this domain.
She has published many highly cited papers in academic journals and conference proceedings. 
She has also served as action editor for the Machine Learning Journal, JAIR associate editor, and TKDD associate editor.  
She is a board member of the International Machine Learning Society, has been a member of AAAI Executive council, was PC co-chair of ICML 2011, and has served as senior PC member for conferences including AAAI, ICML, IJCAI, ISWC, KDD, SIGMOD, UAI, VLDB, WSDM and WWW.

She received her Ph.D. from Stanford University, her M.S. from UC Berkeley, and her B.S. from UC Santa Barbara.
Prior to joining University of California, Santa Cruz, she was a professor at the University of Maryland, College Park until Nov 2013.

Recognition
Getoor has multiple best paper awards, an NSF Career Award, and is an Association for the Advancement of Artificial Intelligence (AAAI) Fellow. 
In 2019, she was elected as an ACM Fellow "for contributions to machine learning, reasoning under uncertainty, and responsible data science",

was selected as a Distinguished Alumna of the UC Santa Barbara Computer Science Department,

was awarded the UCSC WiSE Chancellor's Achievement Award for Diversity,

and was selected to give the UC Santa Cruz Faculty Research Lecture 2018-19, one of the highest recognitions given to UC faculty.
 In October 2022, Getoor was elected a Fellow of the American Association for the Advancement of Science (AAAS).

Getoor's father was mathematician Ronald Getoor (1929–2017).

References

Living people
American women computer scientists
American computer scientists
Machine learning researchers
Artificial intelligence researchers
Fellows of the Association for the Advancement of Artificial Intelligence
Fellows of the Association for Computing Machinery
Logic programming researchers
Women logicians
Stanford University alumni
University of California, Santa Cruz faculty
University of Maryland, College Park faculty
Women systems scientists
Year of birth missing (living people)
21st-century American women